The Attorney General of the State, or also, Prosecutor General, is the head of the Prosecution Ministry (Ministerio Fiscal), the body with functional autonomy in the Judiciary, that has constitutionally been entrusted with the promotion of the action of the justice in defense of the legality, protecting citizens rights and the public interest, and ensuring the independence of the courts and to seek the satisfaction of the social interest.

The Attorney General is appointed and dismissed by the King, at the proposal of the Government, after hearing the General Council of the Judiciary. The candidate also needs to appear before the Congress to evaluate its suitability but it does not need its approval. Therefore, for its appointment it needs the participation of the three powers of State. The candidate must be a Spanish jurists of recognized prestige and with more than fifteen years of effective exercise of their profession.

The term of the Attorney General is 4 years and may not be renewed, except in cases in which the holder had held the position for a period of less than two years. He can not be removed from his position unless he requests it, for incurring any of the incompatibilities or prohibitions established in this Law, in case of disability or illness that disqualifies him for the position, for serious or repeated breach of his duties or when the Government that has proposed him finish its term.

Functions
According to the law of the Public Prosecution Ministry:
 To coordinate and direct Attorney General Office's action.
 To ensure the independence of judges and courts.
 To give orders and instructions to prosecutors according to its position as head of the Prosecution Ministry.
 To propose to the Government the appointments for the different positions, following a report of the Prosecution Ministry's Council.
 To propose to the Government promotions according to the reports of said Council.
 To grant the licenses that are within your jurisdiction, according to the provisions of this Statute and its Regulations.
 To report to the Government through the Ministry of Justice.
 If the Prime Minister consider it necessary can go directly to it.
 In exceptional cases, it can be called to report before the Council of Ministers.
 To send reports annually to the Cortes Generales and the General Council of the Judiciary about his activity, evolution of criminality, crime prevention and the moreappropriate reforms for greater effectiveness of Justice.
 To resolve the petitions in defense of the public interest by the Autonomous Communities.
 To authorize or deny agreements between the autonomous communities and the different organs of the Prosecution Ministry.
 To dissolve Prosecutors Associations when this ones incur in activities contrary to the law or that exceed the framework of the Statutes

Attorney General's Office
The Office of the Attorney General is an assistant body of the Attorney General of the State. From him depends the following bodies:

 The Prosecution Inspection
 Performs inspection powers by permanent delegation of the Attorney General of the State, without prejudice to the functions of ordinary inspection of the Superior Prosecutions and the inspection functions of the Chief Prosecutors with respect to the Prosecutors who depend on them. Inside of the Prosecution Inspection there is a Permanent Section of Valuation to centralize the information on merit and capacity of the Prosecutors in order to give support to the Prosecution Ministry's Council when reporting discretionary appointments of the Prosecutor Career.

 The Technical Secretariat
 Through its studies, investigations and reports, it is a constant support body for the Attorney General, to exercise the superior leadership of the Public Prosecution Ministry, also carrying out the preparatory work for the Joint of Prosecutors. Collaborates in the planning of the training of the Prosecutors whose competence is attributed to the Center for Legal Studies and assumes the functions that in the field of international legal cooperation the law attributes to the Public Prosecution.
 The Support Unit
 Performs representation work and institutional relations with public authorities, as well as communication and attention to the citizen. It is responsible for the analysis and preparation of reports related to the organization and operation of the Public Prosecution Ministry in matters of statistics, information technology, personnel, material means, information and documentation. In general, it carries out functions of support and assistance to the Attorney General of the State, to the Prosecutors assigned to the Prosecution Ministry, to the Prosecution Ministry's Council and to the Joint of Prosecutors who do not correspond to the Inspection or to the Technical Secretariat.
 The Special Prosecutors
 Prosecutor for Violence against Women
 Prosecutor for Environment and Urbanism
 Prosecutor for the Protection and Reform of Minors
 Prosecutor for Workplace Accidents
 Prosecutor for Traffic Safety
 Prosecutor for Immigration
 Prosecutor for International Criminal Cooperation
 Prosecutor for Computer Crimes

List of attorneys general

 Status

See also
Prosecution Ministry
General Council of the Judiciary
Judiciary of Spain
Justice ministry
Minister of Justice (Spain)
Public Prosecutor (Autonomous Communities of Spain)

References

Notes

Judiciary of Spain
Attorneys general of Spain